Les Anges de Fatima is a football (soccer) club from Central African Republic based in Bangui.

The club was previously known as Association Sportive Diables Rouges de Fatima (ASDR Fatima) but was renamed in April 2016.

Achievements
Central African Republic League: 5
 1974, 1978, 1983, 1988, 2005.

Central African Republic Coupe Nationale: 8
 1980, 1981, 1991, 1993, 1998, 2000, 2008, 2009.

Performance in CAF competitions
CAF Champions League: 2 appearances
2001 – First Round
2006 – Preliminary Round

African Cup of Champions Clubs: 4 appearances
1975 – First Round
1979 – First Round
1984 – First Round
1989 – First Round

CAF Confederation Cup: 2 appearances
2010 – Preliminary Round
2013 –

References

Football clubs in the Central African Republic
Bangui